Michael Joseph McEttrick (June 22, 1848 – December 31, 1921) was a U.S. Representative from Massachusetts.

McEttrick was born in Roxbury, Massachusetts, he graduated from the Washington Grammar and the Roxbury Latin Schools.

He became a journalist.
He served as assistant assessor of Boston in 1884.
He served as a member of the Massachusetts House of Representatives 1885-1891 and chairman of the Democratic members of the house.
He served in the Massachusetts State Senate in 1892.

Mcettrick was elected as an Independent Democrat to the Fifty-third Congress (March 4, 1893-March 3, 1895).
He was an unsuccessful candidate for renomination in 1894 to the Fifty-fourth Congress.

Congressional career

Congressional elections

1892 and 1894
In 1892 and 1894 McEttrick ran for Congress as an independent Democratic for Congress in Massachusetts 10th Congressional District.

He won in 1892 and lost in 1894.

1892
McEttrick won the 1892 election defeating Republican Harrison H. Atwood in a four way race.

1894
McEttrick lost the 1894 election to Republican Harrison H. Atwood.

Return to State office

Massachusetts House of Representatives
McEttrick was again a member of the State house of representatives in 1906, 1907, and 1913.

Massachusetts Senate
McEttrick served in the State Senate in 1908 representing the Fourth Suffolk District.

Later years
McEttrick engaged in the real estate business in Boston, Massachusetts, until his death there on December 31, 1921.
McEttrick was interred in Calvary Cemetery.

References

Bibliography

Footnotes

 

1848 births
1921 deaths
Members of the United States House of Representatives from Massachusetts
Members of the Massachusetts House of Representatives
Massachusetts state senators
Massachusetts Democrats
Massachusetts Independents
Independent Democrat members of the United States House of Representatives
People from Roxbury, Boston
Roxbury Latin School alumni
Burials in Massachusetts